John Lemon (6 November 1754 – 5 April 1814) was a British Whig Member of Parliament.

He was born in Truro, the second son of William Lemon by his marriage to Anne, the daughter of John Willyams of Carnanton House, and was the grandson of William Lemon the Elder (1696–1760), who had acquired a substantial estate at Carclew in 1749, and the younger brother of Sir William Lemon, 1st Baronet.

The young John Lemon was educated at Truro Grammar School and later at Harrow. He became a lieutenant colonel in the Horse Guards.

On 5 April 1814, he died unmarried in Polvellen, Cornwall.

Political career
In 1784 he was elected to the House of Commons for West Looe, a seat he held only briefly. He returned to the Commons as a member for Saltash between 1787 and 1790. In 1796 he was able to buy from Viscount Falmouth a life interest in one of the seats at the pocket borough of Truro and was duly elected for Truro that year, holding the seat until his death in 1814.

On 17 January 1804 Lemon was appointed as one of the Lords Commissioners of the Admiralty, serving for only a month. According to convention, this meant he had to give up his Parliamentary seat on appointment to the Crown Office and seek re-election to his seat at a by-election in February, at which he was re-elected.

Amateur musician and composer
Lemon was an amateur musician and composer. The Cathedral Psalter Chants (1874) included his Double Chant in G, while there is also a Chant in D. A Double Chant in F is in The Parish Psalter with Chants (1932).

References

1754 births
1814 deaths
People from Truro
People from Saltash
People educated at Harrow School
People educated at Truro Cathedral School
Members of the Parliament of Great Britain for West Looe
Members of the Parliament of Great Britain for Saltash
Members of the Parliament of Great Britain for Truro
Members of the Parliament of the United Kingdom for Truro
British MPs 1784–1790
British MPs 1796–1800
UK MPs 1801–1802
UK MPs 1802–1806
UK MPs 1806–1807
UK MPs 1807–1812
UK MPs 1812–1818
Lords of the Admiralty